Indira Gandhi College of Arts and Science, is a general degree college located in Kathirkamam, Puducherry. It was established in the year 2001. The college is affiliated with Pondicherry University. This college offers different courses in arts, commerce and science.

Departments

Science
Chemistry
Mathematics
Statistics
Applied Microbiology
Biotechnology
Biological Science
Computer Science

Arts and Commerce
Tamil
English
French
Hindi
Economics
Foreign Trade
Physical Education
Commerce

Accreditation and Ranking
The college is recognized by the University Grants Commission (UGC) under 2(f) status. This college is accredited with B+ (2016–21) by NAAC, India. Incidentally, it is the only Arts and Science College in Puducherry region under NIRF ranking for three consecutive years (2018, 2019 and 2020)

References

External links

Universities and colleges in Puducherry
Educational institutions established in 2001
2001 establishments in Pondicherry
Colleges affiliated to Pondicherry University